The 1962 FIFA World Cup CAF–UEFA qualification play-off was a two-legged home-and-away tie between the winners of the CAF final round, Morocco, and the winners of the UEFA Group 9 second round, Spain. The matches were played on 12 and 23 November 1961 in Casablanca and Madrid, respectively.

Spain won the series after beating Morocco in both matches (1–0 in Casablanca and 3–2 in Madrid), and therefore qualified for the World Cup.

Venues

Standings

Matches

First leg

Second leg

References

qual
Play-off Caf-Uefa
1962
FIFA
Morocco national football team matches
Spain national football team matches
November 1961 sports events
20th century in Casablanca
1960s in Madrid
Sport in Casablanca
Sports competitions in Madrid
International association football competitions hosted by Morocco
International association football competitions hosted by Spain